The Voice of Happiness (French: La voie du bonheur) is a 1931 French film directed by Léo Joannon.

Cast
 Jean Dehelly 
 René Ferté
 Charley Sov 
 Denise Delannoy
 Simone Bourday
 Pauline Carton 
 Édouard Francomme 
 Monique Priola

References

Bibliography 
 Parish, James Robert. Film Actors Guide. Scarecrow Press, 1977.

External links 
 
 https://www.unifrance.org/film/36166/la-voie-du-bonheur [french]

1931 films
1930s French-language films
Films directed by Léo Joannon
French black-and-white films
1930s French films